Point Isabel may refer to several places in the United States:

Point Isabel (promontory), on the eastern shore of San Francisco Bay, California
Point Isabel Regional Shoreline, a multi-use park in Richmond, California
Point Isabel, Indiana, an unincorporated community
Point Isabel, Kentucky, now Burnside
Point Isabel, Ohio, an unincorporated community
Port Isabel, Texas, a city
Point Isabel Light, a lighthouse
Point Isabel Independent School District
Point Isabel, Virginia, or Robley, an unincorporated community